Roger Cudney (June 22, 1936 – July 5, 2021) was an American actor, singer, dubbing director, radio and television announcer.

Biography

Born in Cleveland, Ohio, Cudney was known for starring in numerous Mexican films and telenovelas in which he often portrayed authoritarian characters or other villains. In 2003, The Wall Street Journal described his career playing 'unpopular gringos':MEXICO CITY -- Roger Cudney, a smallish, 66-year-old with a receding hairline and a gleaming smile, may be the most notorious gringo in Mexico. Some Mexicans know him as a plunderer of ancient archaeological treasures. Others remember him as the union-busting manager of a sweatshop. Still others recognize Mr. Cudney as a pathologically nasty Texas ranger or a meddling diplomat.

Mr. Cudney has been all of these things and more in a 30-year acting career in Mexican TV and movies. The Ohio-born Mr. Cudney came to Mexico in the 1960s to play the lead in the musical Show Boat but he soon found a different dramatic calling. "Roger Cudney is the epitome of the bad gringo, a blending of all the worst American stereotypes," says David Wilt, who compiled the Biographical Dictionary of Mexican Film Performers.

On the [2001] Mexican soap opera, Amigas y rivales (Friends and Rivals), Mr. Cudney was a racist South Texas rancher who caught a couple of illegal Mexican immigrants trespassing on his property, shortly after the World Trade Center attack. "Git off of my land," the actor snarled, waving a shotgun. Then, in his distinctively accented Spanish, he ad-libbed: "Thousands of Americans have just died in New York. They shouldn't let anyone enter my country anymore."
Cudney also had parts in mainstream Hollywood films, including a co-starring role opposite Charles Bronson in The Evil That Men Do, Total Recall, Rambo: First Blood Part II, the James Bond film Licence to Kill, Julia, Perdita Durango and Original Sin.  He portrayed the part of the United States Ambassador to Mexico in La Dictadura Perfecta.

Cudney was married, with three sons and one daughter.

He died on July 5, 2021, of a heart attack following a car accident.

Filmography

Television

References

External links 
 

1936 births
2021 deaths
People from Cleveland
20th-century American male actors
21st-century American male actors
Male actors from Ohio
American male film actors